British Home Stores Ltd v Burchell [1978] ICR 303 is a UK labour law case, concerning unfair dismissal.

Facts
Miss Burchell got her job back at British Home Stores Ltd, and did not appear to contest the appeal by the employer against a tribunal decision about her dismissal.

Judgment
Arnold J said the following.

Notes

References

United Kingdom labour case law
Employment Appeal Tribunal cases
1978 in British law
1978 in case law